Frank Villard (24 March 1917 – 19 September 1980) was a French film actor. He was born François Drouineau in  Saint-Jean-d'Angély.

Selected filmography

 The Last of the Six (1941) - Un homme (uncredited)
 Cartacalha, reine des gitans (1942)
 Feu sacré (1942) - Jean Delmas
 Box of Dreams (1945) - Jean
 The Faceless Enemy (1946) - Inspecteur Wens / Inspector Wens
 The Marriage of Ramuntcho (1947) - Georges Baermann
 The Mysterious Monsieur Sylvain (1947) - Ancelin
 Fausse identité (1947) - L'inspecteur Rolle
 Le cavalier de Croix-Mort (1948) - François d'Anthar
 Les souvenirs ne sont pas à vendre (1948) - Jean
 Le signal rouge (1949) - Ing. Nicolas Riedel
 Gigi (1949) - Gaston
 Vient de paraître (1949) - Maréchal
 Manèges (1950) - François
 Minne (1950) - Antoine
 Fusillé à l'aube (1950) - Rudolf Hennings
 Les amants de Bras-Mort (1951) - Jean Michaut
 The Beautiful Image (1951) - Raoul Cérusier / Roland Colbert
 Avalanche (1951) - Edouard Bouchard
 Savage Triangle (1951) - Paul
 The Cape of Hope (1951) - Robert 'Bob' Legeay
 Les Sept Péchés capitaux (1952) - Ravila (segment "Luxure, La / Lust")
 The Shameless Sex (1952) - Stefano Lari
 Voice of Silence (1953) - Mario Rossi
 Mandat d'amener (1953) - Gérard Latour
 Nuits andalouses (1954) - Armand de Puysherbeux
 The Secret of Helene Marimon (1954) - Jacques Taillandier
 Huis clos (1954) - Garcin - une belle gouape
 Boulevard du crime (1955) - Gilbert Renaud
 Girls of Today (1955) - Armando
 Les indiscrètes (1956) - Pierre Fleury
 Je plaide non coupable (1956) - Pierre Lemaire
 Beatrice Cenci (1956) - Giudice Ranieri
 Alerte au deuxième bureau (1956) - Le capitaine Thierry
 Soupçons (1956) - Etienne Jean Marie de Montenoy
 Deuxième bureau contre inconnu (1957) - Capitaine Thierry
 The Mysteries of Paris (1957) - Prince Rodolfo di Gerolstein
 Sylviane de mes nuits (1957) - Michel Lenoir
 The Violet Seller (1958) - Henri Garnard
 Rapt au deuxième bureau (1958) - Captain Thierry
 The Enigma of the Folies-Bergere (1959) - Le commissaire Raffin
 The Price of Flesh (1959) - Daniel, the journalist
 Deuxième bureau contre terroristes (1961) - Jacques Martin
 El secreto de los hombres azules (1961) - Hernandez
 Le cave se rebiffe (1961) - Eric Masson
 Un branco di vigliacchi (1962) - De Rossi
 Le Crime ne paie pas (1962) - M. Lenormand (segment "L'affaire Hugues")
 The Lovely Lola (1962) - Gabriel
 Gigot (1962) - Pierre
 The Gentleman from Epsom (1962) - Lucien
 No temas a la ley (1963) - Jean Farand
 Mata Hari, Agent H21 (1964) - Colonel Emile Pelletier / Legrand
 Quand passent les faisans (1965) - Chinaud (uncredited)
 Les Bons Vivants (1965) - Marcel Froment (segments "Fermeture, La" and "Procès, Le")
 Soleil noir (1966) - Le curé
 Comptes à rebours (1971)
 Apocalypse Now (1979) - Gaston de Marais (Redux and Final Cut versions only)

References

Bibliography
 Goble, Alan.  The Complete Index to Literary Sources in Film.  Walter de Gruyter, 1999.

External links
 

1917 births
1980 deaths
French male film actors
20th-century French male actors